Tielen or Tielenhof Castle is a castle in Tielen, Belgium.

See also
List of castles in Belgium

Castles in Belgium
Castles in Antwerp Province
Kasterlee